The Health Services Workers' Union (HSWU) is a trade union representing skilled workers in the health sector in Ghana.

The HSWU is affiliated to the Ghana Trades Union Congress.  In addition to workers in the formal heath sector, it also represents traditional birth attendants, and practitioners and retailers of traditional medicine.  As of 2018, it had 28,811 members.

References

Trade unions in Ghana
Trade unions established in 1965
Healthcare trade unions